Bernardo Silva (born 1994) is a Portuguese professional footballer.

Bernardo Silva may also refer to:
 Bernardo Silva (sailor) (1935–1997), Portuguese sailor
 Bernardo Silva (footballer, born 2001), Portuguese footballer
 Bernardo Silva Francisco (born 1995), Portuguese footballer